Paulinus of St. Bartholomew (b. at Hof am Leithaberge in Lower Austria, 25 April 1748; d. in Rome, 7 January 1806) was an Austrian Carmelite missionary and Orientalist of Croatian origin. He is known by several names as Paulinus S. Bartholomaeo, Paolino da San Bartolomeo, Paulinus Paathiri, Paulin de St Barthelemi, Paulinus A S. Bartholomaeo, Johann Philipp Wesdin, or Johann Philipp Werdin.

He is credited with being the author of the first Sanskrit grammar to be published in Europe, and for being one of the first Orientalists to remark upon the close relationship between Indian and European languages, followed by others such as William Jones and Gaston-Laurent Coeurdoux.

Life
He was born in a peasant family in Lower Austria, and took the religious habit at the age of twenty. He studied theology and philosophy at Prague. Having entered into the seminary of the missions of his order at Rome, he did Oriental studies at the College of St Pancratius.

He was sent in 1774 as missionary to Malabar, India. After spending fourteen years in India, he was appointed vicar-general of his order and apostolic visitor. He was very well versed in languages: he spoke German, Latin, Greek, Hebrew, Hungarian, Italian, Portuguese, English, Malayalam, Sanskrit, and some other languages of India. He became known in Kerala as Paulinus Paathiri. He was one of the first to detect the similarity between Sanskrit and Indo-European languages, though the very first was likely Fr Thomas Stephens, SJ.

Recalled in 1789 to Rome to give an account of the state of the mission in Indostan, he was charged with editing books – to correct the Catechisms and elementary books printed at Rome  –  for the use of missionaries. On account of political troubles he stayed from 1798 to 1800 at Vienna.

In Rome, he came into contact with Cardinal Stefano Borgia, Secretary of Propaganda Fide, antiquarian scholar and patron, who had set up in Velletri, his native city, the very well-endowed Museo Borgiano. Cardinal Borgia appointed him his private secretary and financed the publication of many volumes of indology, including the first European grammar of the Sanskrit language (Sidharubam seu Grammatica Samscrdamica), published in Rome in 1790. Paulinus also wrote, in Italian, a long essay on India (Viaggio alle Indie Orientali) which was translated into the principal European languages.

In 1800, Pope Pius VII appointed him as counsellor of the Congregation of the Index and as inspector of studies at the Pontifical Urban University. He wrote an account of his travels, translated into French, under the title Voyage aux Index Orientales, published at Paris in 1808.

While in Europe, he also made known the works of Johann Ernst Hanxleden (Arnos Paathiri). He had carried some of Hanxleden's works to Europe. He also wrote about Hanxleden and quotes him extensively in his memoirs.

When Cardinal Borgia died suddenly at Lyons while accompanying Pius VII to Napoleon, Paulinus wrote a moving biography of him.

Works

Paulinus wrote many learned books on the East, which were highly valued in their day, among them the first printed Sanskrit grammar. They include:

 'Systema brahmanicum liturgicum, mythologicum, civile, ex monumentis indicis musei Borgiani Velitris dissertationibus historico-criticis illustratu (Rome, 1791), translated into German (Gotha, 1797);
Examen historico-criticum codicum indicorum bibliothecae S. C. de Propaganda (Rome, 1792);
Musei Borgiani Velitris codices manuscripti avences, Peguani, Siamici, Malabarici, Indostani ... illustrati (Rome, 1793);
Viaggio alle Indie orientali (Rome, 1796), translated into German by Forster (Berlin, 1798);
Sidharubam, seu Grammatica sanscridamica, cui accedit dissert. hiss. crit. in linguam sanscridamicam vulgo Samscret dictam (Rome, 1799), another edition of which appeared under the title "Vyacaranam" (Rome, 1804);
India orientalis christiana (Rome, 1794), an important work for the history of missions in India. Other works bear on linguistics and church history.
 Paolino da San Bartolomeo, Viaggio alle Indie Orientali umiliato alla Santita di N. S. Papa Pio Sesto pontefice massimo da fra Paolino da S. Bartolomeo carmelitano scalzo, Roma, presso Antonio Fulgoni, 1796.
 Paolino da San Bartolomeo, Voyage aux Indes Orientales, par le p. Paulin de S. Barthelemy, missionnaire; traduit de l'italien ... avec les observations de Mm. Anquetil du Perron, J. R. Forster et Silvestre de Sacy; et une dissertation de M. Anquetil sur la proprieté (in lingua francese), A Paris, chez Tourneisen fils, libraire, rue de Seine, n 12, 1808.
 Paulinus a S. Bartholomaeo, Amarasinha. Sectio prima de caelo ex tribus ineditis codicibus indicis manuscriptis curante P. Paulino a S. Bartholomaeo ... (in lingua Latina), Romae, apud Antonium Fulgonium, 1798.
 Paulinus von Heilig Bartholomaus, Atlas pour servir au voyage aux Indes orientales. Par le p. Paulin de Saint-Barthelemy, missionaire (in lingua francese), A Paris, chez Tourneisen fils, 1808.
 Paulinus a S. Bartholomaeo. De basilica S. Pancratii M. Christi disquisitio. Auctore P. Paulino a S. Bartholomaeo (in lingua Latina), Romae, apud Antonium Fulgonium, 1803.
 Paulinus a S. Bartholomaeo, Dissertation on the Sanskrit language, Paulinus a S. Bartholomaeo (in lingua inglese), a reprint of the original Latin text of 1790, together with an introductory article, a complete English translation, and an index of sources by Ludo Rocher, Amsterdam, J. Benjamin, 1977.
 Paulinus a S. Bartholomaeo, Examen historico criticum codicum indicorum bibliothecae Sacrae Congregationis de propaganda fide (in lingua Latina), Romae, ex typ. S. C. de Propaganda Fide, 1792.
 Paulinus a S. Bartholomaeo, India orientalis christiana continens fundationes ecclesiarum, seriem episcoporum, Auctore P. Paulino a S. Bartholomaeo carmelita discalceato (in lingua Latina), Romae, typis Salomonianis, 1794.
 Paulinus a S. Bartholomaeo, Jornandis vindiciae de Var Hunnorum auctore p. Paulino a S. Bartolomeo carmelita discalceato ... (in lingua Latina), Romae, Apud Antonium Fulgonium, 1800.
 Paolino da San Bartolomeo, Monumenti indici del Museo Naniano illustrati dal P. Paolino da S. Bartolomeo (in lingua Latina), In Padova, nella Stamperia del Seminario, 1799.
 Paulinus a S. Bartholomaeo, Mumiographia Musei Obiciani exarata a P. Paulino a S.Bartholomaeo carmelita discalceato (in lingua Latina), Patavii, ex Typographia Seminarii, 1799.
 Paulinus a S. Bartholomaeo, Musei Borgiani Velitris codices manuscripti Avenses Peguani Siamici Malabarici Indostani animadversionibus historico-criticis castigati et illustrati accedunt monumenta inedita, et cosmogonia Indico-Tibetana, auctore p. Paulino a S. Bartholomaeo ... (in lingua Latina), Romae, apud Antonium FUgonium, 1793.
 Paulinus a S. Bartholomaeo, Sidharubam seu Grammatica Samscrdamica. Siddarupam. Cui accedit Dissertatio historico-critica in linguam Samscrdamicam vulgo Samscret dictam, in qua huius linguae exsistentia, origo, praestantia, antiquitas, extensio, maternitas ostenditur, libri aliqui ea exarati critice recensentur, & simul aliquae antiquissimae gentilium orationes liturgicae paucis attinguntur, & explicantur auctore Fr. Paulino a S. Bartholomaeo ... (in lingua Latina), Romae, ex typographia Sacrae Congregationis de Propaganda Fide, 1790.
 Paulinus a S. Bartholomaeo, Systema Brahmanicum liturgicum mythologicum civile ex monumentis Indicis musei Borgiani Velitris dissertationibus historico-criticis illustravit fr. Paullinus a S. Bartholomaeo carmelita discalceatus Malabariae missionarius Academiae Volscorum Veliternae socius (in lingua Latina), Romae, apud Antonium Fulgonium, 1791.
 Paulinus a S. Bartholomaeo, Vitae synopsis Stephani Borgiae S.R.E. cardinalis amplissimi S. Congr. De Propaganda fide praefecti curante p. Paulino a S. Bartholomaeo carmelita discalceato ... (in lingua Latina), Romae, apud Antonium Fulgonium, 1805.
 Paulinus a S. Bartholomaeo, Vyacarana seu Locupletissima Samscrdamicae linguae institutio in usum Fidei praeconum in India Orientali, et virorum litteratorum in Europa adornata a P. Paulino a S. Bartholomaeo Carmelita discalceato (in lingua Latina), Romae, typis S. Congreg. de Propag. Fide, 1804.
 Paulinus a S. Bartholomaeo, Notitia topographica, civilis, politica, religiosa missionis Malabaricae ad finem saeculi 18. / auctore r. P. Paulino a S. Bartholomaeo, O. C. D. (in lingua Latina), Romae, apud Curiam generalitiam, 1937, Tip. A. Manuzio.
 Paulinus of St. Bartholomew: De manuscriptis codicibus indicis R. P. Joan Ernesti Hanxleden epistola ad. R. P. Alexium Mariam A. S. Joseph Carmelitam excalceatum, Vienna, 1799.

Notes

References 
  The entry cites:
 Giuseppe Barone, Vita, precursori ed opere del P. Paolino da S. Bartolommeo (Filippo Werdin) : contributo alla storia degli studi orientali in Europa (Napoli: A. Morano, 1888);
 Max von Heimbucher, Die Orden und Kongregationen der katholischen Kirche, II (2nd ed., Paderborn: Schoningh, 1907), 568-69

External links
 Paulinus of St. Bartholomew
 PAULINUS A S. BARTHOLOMAEO (WERDIN , JOHANN PHILIP)
 Catholic Missionaries - John Philip Werdin

1748 births
1806 deaths
18th-century Austrian people
Carmelites
Austrian people of Croatian descent
Austrian Roman Catholic missionaries
Roman Catholic missionaries in India
Austrian orientalists
Austrian expatriates in India
Austrian expatriates in Italy
Burgenland Croats
People from Bruck an der Leitha District